Pratheeksha is a special school located at Mampetta, a hamlet in between Mukkam and Kettangal villages of Kozhikode, Kerala. The school has an enrollment of 52 children with intellectual disabilities and hearing impairments.

References

http://pratheeksha.net/

Special schools in India
Schools for the deaf in India
Schools in Kozhikode district
Educational institutions established in 2007
2007 establishments in Kerala